Amir Saoud (born January 18, 1991) is a Lebanese professional basketball player currently playing for Sporting Al Riyadi Beirut in the Lebanese Basketball League and the Lebanon national team. He started his professional playing career in 2010, playing a season for Hoops Club. Amir often plays in the point guard and shooting guard positions.

References

External list
 Asia-Basket page
 Profile at RealGM.com
 

Lebanese men's basketball players
1991 births
Living people
Sportspeople from Beirut
Shooting guards